Pet Pals: Animal Doctor is a video game created by Legacy Interactive in which the player is a veterinarian, and must take care of 35 animals brought to their clinic. In the Wii version the player takes care of 30 animals. It is rated E10+ by the American Entertainment Software Rating Board.

In 2007, it was given the "Silver honor" award by the Parents' Choice Foundation.

Notes
 If you get 1000 points in a case, you get a perfect score trophy.
 If you do something wrong, incorrectly diagnose the animal and ask the wrong questions you won't get a trophy.

See also
Zoo Vet

References

External links
Legacy Interactive site

2006 video games
MacOS games
Majesco Entertainment games
Medical video games
Nintendo DS games
Video games developed in the United States
Wii games
Windows games
Virtual pet video games
Legacy Games games